Primauguet was a French  light cruiser built after World War I. During the Anglo-American invasion of French North Africa in 1942, she was burnt out and abandoned, having been subject to gunfire from a fleet led by the battleship , and repeated aerial attacks by SBD Dauntless dive bombers. She was named after the 15th century Breton captain Hervé de Portzmoguer, nicknamed "Primauguet".

Design and description
The design of the Duguay-Trouin class was based on an improved version of a 1915 design, but was reworked with more speed and a more powerful armament to match the British  and the American  light cruisers. Their crew consisted of 591 men when serving as flagships.

Service
Primauguet was commissioned in April 1927 and immediately commenced a seven-month world cruise, returning in mid-December. The pattern of extended cruises was maintained until April 1932, when she was stationed in the Far East until a refit in January 1936. The Far East posting was resumed in November 1937 until she was relieved by the cruiser  and returned to France.

The first months of World War II were spent on Atlantic patrols, convoy escort and surveillance of Axis shipping. On 1 April 1940, she sailed for Fort-de-France in the West Indies, to replace the cruiser . She operated in Dutch West Indies waters, intercepting merchant ships. Primauguet returned to Dakar on 12 June 1940, after the French surrender.

Primauguet remained with the Vichy French Navy after the French surrender in 1940. She brought a part of the French Gold Reserve of Banque de France in Africa. Primauguet  was at Dakar in July 1940 during the Royal Navy's attack on the French fleet at Mers-el-Kebir.

She was sent to escort an oiler in support of three s of the 4th Squadron. They were on an operation to Libreville, in French Equatorial Africa, to counter Free French activity. After negotiations, Primauguet was ordered to turn back to Casablanca by Admiral Bourague, aboard .

On 8 November 1941, she began a refit in Casablanca and was not fully operational when the Naval Battle of Casablanca began exactly one year later. She was also subject to four waves of aerial attack by Douglas Dauntless dive-bombers from the aircraft carrier , which claimed six direct hits. Massively outmatched by the opposing firepower, she was badly damaged and suffered many casualties. To allow the crew to be evacuated, the ship ran in close to the shore and dropped anchor in shallow water, where she burnt out overnight. Although sources regularly state that she was run aground, photographs taken after the battle show her lying at anchor, inoperable but apparently still afloat.

The wreck of Primauguet was sold in 1951, and broken up for scrap.

Notes

Bibliography 

 

  

Duguay-Trouin-class cruisers
Ships built in France
1924 ships
World War II cruisers of France
Shipwrecks of Africa
Maritime incidents in November 1942